Garrucha is a municipality of Almería province, in the autonomous community of Andalusia, Spain. Garrucha is a seaport of south-eastern Spain on the Mediterranean Sea and the right bank of the river Antas. In 1998 the town had a population of 5000. The harbor of Garrucha, which is defended by an eighteenth-century castle, affords shelter to large ships, and is the natural outlet for the commerce of a once thriving agricultural and mining district. Garrucha had, at the beginning of the twentieth century a considerable trade in lead, silver, copper, iron, esparto grass and fruit, but now the only export from its harbour is gypsum mined in Sorbas, with a million metric tonnes being exported annually. Besides cargo ships, the port is home to a small fishing fleet and has approximately 300 moorings for leisure boats.

Demographics

Sport
Garrucha's local football team P.D. Garrucha (Pena Deportivo Garrucha) play in a provincial league within the province of Almeria. The club currently play at  the Emilio Moldenhauer ground at the edge of the town. The  town has a few other sporting facilities in the area including a harbour side basketball court and a five-a-side football court with two volleyball courts on the town's beaches. A new Gymnasium  was completed in the beginning of 2015.

Tourism
The town is visited by tourists from Spain and also the continent. There are many seafront bars and restaurants serving locally produced goods like fish and the produce from farms in the surrounding area.

References

External links
 garrucha.es the Ayuntamiento (Town) de Garrucha
  Garrucha - Sistema de Información Multiterritorial de Andalucía
  Garrucha - Diputación Provincial de Almería

Municipalities in the Province of Almería